Provincial Trunk Highway 83 (PTH 83) is a major north-south highway that runs in the far western region of the Canadian province of Manitoba. It travels from the North Dakota border south of Melita, north through Virden, Birtle, Russell, and Roblin to its northern terminus with PTH 10 in the town of Swan River.

History 
PTH 83 first appeared on the 1953 Manitoba Highway Map.

Prior to 1953, PTH 83 was originally numbered as Highway 22. In 1953, the government re-designated it to match U.S. Route 83. As well, the current section of the highway between Russell and Swan River was known as Highway 31.

Originally, the highway's northern terminus was at the Trans-Canada Highway in Virden, making the original length of the highway . The section of PTH 83 between the Trans-Canada Highway and Birtle was opened to traffic in 1954. At the same time, the highway was extended to Swan River, replacing Highway 31.

A small portion of PTH 83 between Roblin and Russell was reconstructed due to a large slide that occurred in early July 2012. The area affected was located one kilometre north of PR 366 at the bottom of the Shell Valley with traffic detoured around that portion of highway. The slide became serious enough to close the road on July 2.  The area which was closed had encountered numerous slides in previous years. It was once home to a lookout point over the Assessippi Valley. That lookout point was declared unsafe and was closed during a previous partial collapse of the road.

Major intersections

References

External links 

083